Marcus Goldhaber (born September 13, 1978) is NYC based American Jazz vocalist from Buffalo, New York. His debut album, The Moment After, was released in 2006.

Career
A native of Buffalo, New York, Goldhaber, learned songs from the Great American Songbook from his mother, who played them on the piano. After graduating from SUNY Fredonia with a degree in Musical Theater, he worked as an actor in New York City.

Influences he cites Chet Baker, Harry Connick Jr., and Sarah Vaughn.

Discography
 The Moment After (Fallen Apple, 2006)
 Take Me Anywhere (Fallen Apple, 2008)
 Almost Love (Fallen Apple, 2012)
 A Lovely Way to Spend an Evening (Fallen Apple, 2014)
 Carry You On (Fallen Apple, 2017)

References

External links
 Official site
 All About Jazz interview
  All About Jazz archive 
 Album review at Jazz Review

1978 births
Living people
Musicians from Buffalo, New York
Jazz musicians from New York (state)
American jazz singers
21st-century American singers
21st-century American male singers
American male jazz musicians